Gregory M. Guillot is a lieutenant general in the United States Air Force who serves as the deputy commander of United States Central Command since July 2022. He served as commander of the Ninth Air Force from 2020 to 2022.

Air Force career
Gregory M. Guillot is from Tucson, Arizona and graduated from high school there in 1984. He attended the University of Arizona before transferring to the United States Air Force Academy where he graduated  in 1989 and commissioned as a second lieutenant. He was selected as an air battle manager in 1990, and attended the initial training course at Tyndall AFB. He was the chief of Weapons and Tactics at the 607th Air Control Squadron at Luke AFB, and attended USAF Weapons School at Nellis AFB in 1995. He later served as a Weapons School instructor, and flew on the E-3 Sentry AWACS at Tinker AFB. He served as the Director of Operations at the 966th Airborne Air Control Squadron, and later as the commander of the 965th Airborne Air Control Squadron. In May 2010, he became the commander of the 380th Expeditionary Operations Group at Al Dhafra Air Base. In June 2012, he became the commander of the 552nd Air Control Wing, and was the commander of the 55th Wing at Offutt AFB from 2013 to 2015. Prior to taking command of the Ninth Air Force, he served as the Director of Operations at United States Northern Command.

In May 2022, Guillot was nominated for assignment as deputy commander of U.S. Central Command.

Effective dates of promotions

References

Living people
Recipients of the Air Force Distinguished Service Medal
Recipients of the Defense Superior Service Medal
Recipients of the Legion of Merit
United States Air Force Academy alumni
United States Air Force generals
Year of birth missing (living people)